Old Episcopal Manse is a historic Episcopal manse building on New York State Route 23, Main Street in Prattsville, Greene County, New York.  It was built about 1845 and is a -story, cross-gable house type with Gothic Revival style features. It features board and batten siding and a steeply pitched gable roof. Also on the property is a carriage house, also built about 1845.

It was added to the National Register of Historic Places in 2000.

References

Properties of religious function on the National Register of Historic Places in New York (state)
Gothic Revival architecture in New York (state)
Religious buildings and structures completed in 1845
Buildings and structures in Greene County, New York
National Register of Historic Places in Greene County, New York